Yaad Rakhegi Duniya is a 1992 Indian romantic drama film directed by Deepak Anand on his debut. It stars Aditya Pancholi, Rukhsar Rehman. It is a remake of the Telugu film Geethanjali, directed by Mani Ratnam.

Plot
Vicky Anand has just graduated from college with honors and decides to celebrate. An accident leads him to the hospital and the shocking discovery that he's suffering from a terminal illness. He decides to move to the lush, green locales of Ooty, a hill-station hoping to find peace and solitude, where he meets Naina, a precocious young woman who enjoy playing pranks. Vicky finds support and encouragement befriending her and eventually falls in love with the mischievous and outgoing Naina, who also suffers from a terminal illness. Vicky learns of Naina's illness, and discusses this with her father, who is a doctor, who confirms it, saying that there is no cure. Despite this, Vicky wants to marry her. When Vicky's mother comes to visit her son, he tells her about his love for Naina, and she is delighted. She rushes over to meet Naina for the first time, and is pleased with Vicky's choice. Then unknowingly she blurts out a truth so devastating, that it will change Naina's final remaining days forever.

Cast
 Aditya Pancholi as Vicky Anand
 Rukhsar Rehman as Naina
 Tinnu Anand as Shikari
 Vikram Gokhale as Doctor
 Arun Bakshi as Mr. Anand
 Anjana Mumtaz as Mrs. Anand
 Yunus Parvez as Shikari's Advisor
 Dina Pathak as Naina's Grandmother

Trackslist
The music was composed by Anand–Milind, while Sameer wrote the lyrics. The soundtrack is remembered for the melodious songs like, "Tujhe Rab Ne Banaya Kis Liye", sung by Mohammed Aziz & Sadhana Sargam and "Tere Liye Sari Umar Jaagun" by Amit Kumar.

References

External links 
 

1992 films
1990s Hindi-language films
1990s romantic comedy-drama films
Films scored by Anand–Milind
Hindi remakes of Telugu films
Indian romantic comedy-drama films
Indian films about cancer
1992 comedy films